Zion is a settlement in the southeast of the island of Nevis in Saint Kitts and Nevis. It is located inland from the coast, to the northwest of Market Shop.

Populated places in Saint Kitts and Nevis
Saint George Gingerland Parish